Nandini Layout was a village before it was converted into a residential area and is located in west Bangalore. It is 7 km from Majestic.  It is famous for parks. Adjacent to the Main Bus stand is the Nandini Layout Central Park, also known as Circular Park, as it is circular in shape and is concentrically surrounded by roads. Nandini Layout is surrounded by Peenya, Kurubarahalli, Mahalakshmi Layout and Yeswanthpur. It is known as the Ooty of Bangalore for its trees and greenery.

References 
 http://www.thehindu.com/news/national/karnataka/navarathri-programmes-at-nandini-layout/article6449022.ece
 
 http://www.deccanherald.com/content/233061/nandini-layout-residents-protest.html

Neighbourhoods in Bangalore